Fagitana littera, the marsh fern moth, is a moth of the family Noctuidae. It is listed as a species of special concern in the US state of Connecticut. It was described by Achille Guenée in 1852.

Larval foods
Thelypteris palustris is reported as the only known host plant for the species.

References

Hadeninae